The 2009 Belgian Super Cup is a football match that was played on 25 July 2009, between league winners Standard Liège and cup winners K.R.C. Genk. The cup was won 2–0 by Standard Liège.

Match details

See also
Belgian Supercup

2009
Standard Liège matches
K.R.C. Genk matches
2009–10 in Belgian football
July 2009 sports events in Europe